The AACTA Award for Best Editing is an award presented by the Australian Academy of Cinema and Television Arts (AACTA), a non-profit organisation whose aim is to "identify, award, promote and celebrate Australia's greatest achievements in film and television." The award is presented at the annual AACTA Awards, which hand out accolades for achievements in feature film, television, documentaries and short films. From 1976 to 2010, the category was presented by the Australian Film Institute (AFI), the Academy's parent organisation, at the annual Australian Film Institute Awards (known as the AFI Awards). When the AFI launched the Academy in 2011, it changed the annual ceremony to the AACTA Awards, with the current award being a continuum of the AFI Award for Best Editing.

Best Cinematography was first presented in 1976 with the winner being chosen by the Film Editors Guild of Australia (FEGA). The award is presented to the editor of a film that is Australian-made, or with a significant amount of Australian content. William M. Anderson and Jill Bilcock have won the award four times each, more than any other editor.

Winners and nominees

See also
Australian Screen Editors

References

E
Film editing awards